Xandré Vos (born ) is a South African rugby union player for the C’Chartres Rugby Club of Federale 1. His regular position is prop.

References

South African rugby union players
Living people
1996 births
People from Makhanda, Eastern Cape
Rugby union props
Eastern Province Elephants players
Southern Kings players
New England Free Jacks players
Rugby union players from Pretoria